Bernard Eugene Custis (September 23, 1928 – February 23, 2017) was an American and Canadian football player who went on to a distinguished coaching career. He is known for having been the first black professional quarterback in the modern era and first in professional Canadian football, starting for the Hamilton Tiger-Cats in 1951.

In 2019, Bernie Custis Secondary School officially opened in Hamilton, Ontario. The school is located adjacent to Tim Hortons Field (and formerly Ivor Wynne Stadium), home site of the Tiger-Cats and Bernie's first professional games.

Early life 
Custis was born in Philadelphia in 1928, and graduated from John Bartram High School in Philadelphia in 1947. He excelled in track in high school.

College playing career 
Custis was a star quarterback for the Syracuse Orange football in 1948, 1949 and 1950, setting numerous Syracuse records that would last for decades. Custis was recruited by Coach Reaves Baysinger, who was replaced by Ben Schwartzwalder  after a 1–8 season. He played the first two seasons of the Coach Schwartzwalder's 25-year tenure at Syracuse. The team went 4–5 in 1949 and 5–5 in 1950.

Custis was awarded the Syracuse Football team's Most Valuable Player trophy for the 1948 season.

Custis roomed with Al Davis, the future coach and owner of the Oakland Raiders, at Syracuse.

Syracuse passing statistics

Professional playing career

National Football League 
He was drafted in the eleventh round of the 1951 NFL draft by the Cleveland Browns. As the Browns already had eventual Pro Football Hall of Famer Otto Graham as their starting quarterback at the time, Custis stood no chance of becoming a starting quarterback (the NFL, although it had recently begun accepting black players again, had also not had a black quarterback in three decades), and the Browns offered Custis a chance to play safety instead. When Custis refused, the Browns then offered to release him, on the condition that he would not play for another NFL team.

Canadian football 
Custis chose to sign with the Hamilton Tiger-Cats in the Interprovincial Rugby Football Union (IRFU), the league that would form the eastern division of the Canadian Football League in 1958. Custis played during Canadian football's transition to its modern era, which apart from the official founding of the CFL is generally regarded as having been completed by 1954 or 1955.

Custis started at quarterback for Hamilton in 1951, becoming the first black player to play quarterback in Canadian professional football. He started every game for Hamilton in 1951, in both the regular season and playoffs, which finished with a 7–5 record. They won their first-round playoff game 24–7 over Toronto in Toronto. They lost in the Eastern finals to Ottawa 9–11 in front of a sell-out crowd of over 17,000 at Hamilton Civic Stadium. Custis was named to the IRFU All Star team as a quarterback in 1951.

Despite being an All-Star at quarterback, he was switched to running back in 1952, where he was also a successful player. The 1952 Tiger-Cats had an outstanding regular season, finishing 9–2–1, but lost in the playoff finals to Toronto 7–12.

In 1953, Custis played for Hamilton in their victory in the 41st Grey Cup game, the Canadian pro football championship game, defeating the Winnipeg Blue Bombers 12–6.

Custis finished his professional career with the Ottawa Rough Riders, playing running back in 1955 and 1956.

Coaching career 
After the end of his professional career, he stayed in Canada and began a career as a teacher and elementary school principal. At the same time, he coached junior level football, most notably with the Oakville Black Knights and Burlington Braves of the Canadian Junior Football League (CJFL). At Burlington, he coached future Canadian Football Hall of Fame player Tony Gabriel.

From 1973 to 1980, he served as a head coach at Sheridan College. During his tenure, his record was 86–14, winning six consecutive Eastern College Championships from 1973–78.

In 1981, he accepted the head coach position at McMaster University. In his second year with the Marauders, he improved the team's standing from seventh to first place. Over eight seasons he led the Marauders to a 31–23–1 record. He was named the OUAA Coach of the Year in 1982 and 1984 and was named CIAU Coach of the Year in 1982. He was inducted into the McMaster Athletic Hall of Fame in 2000.

In 1994, he was inducted into the Canadian Football Hall of Fame as a "builder" for his contributions to junior and college football in Canada.

Highlights and honors

As a player 
 IRFU (Canadian League) All Star 1951 as Quarterback
 IRFU (Canadian League) All Star 1954 as Running Back
 1953 Grey Cup Winners (Canadian Football Championship)
 Syracuse University Athletic Hall of Fame (1977 Inductee)

As a coach 
 All-Star Coach 1975, 1977, 1978
 OUAA Coach of the Year 1982, 1983, 1984, 1985
 CIAU Coach of the Year (Frank Tindall Trophy) 1982
 Canadian Football Hall of Fame (1998 Inductee)
 McMaster University Hall of Fame (2000 Inductee)

See also 
 Racial issues faced by black quarterbacks
 List of black quarterbacks
 List of Grey Cup champions

References

External links 
  Syracuse football links: Former Orange QB Bernie Custis honored for breaking down barriers
  Bernie Custis at cfhof.ca
  Syracuse
  Meet Bernie Custis, football’s first African-American quarterback
  Hamilton Tiger-Cats
  Halton Breaking News - Halton's Online Newspaper
  Tourism Burlington
  Syracuse QB Bernie Custis Honored For Breaking Color Barrier
  Bernie Custis athletic career, photos, articles, and videos | Fanbase
Videos
 A Star is born: 
 2013 Hamilton Sports Hall of Fame Inductee: 

1928 births
2017 deaths
Players of American football from Washington, D.C.
African-American players of American football
American football quarterbacks
John Bartram High School alumni
Syracuse Orange football players
African-American players of Canadian football
Canadian football quarterbacks
Canadian football running backs
Hamilton Tiger-Cats players
Ottawa Rough Riders players
Coaches of Canadian football
Academic staff of Sheridan College
McMaster Marauders football coaches
Canadian Football Hall of Fame inductees
20th-century African-American sportspeople
21st-century African-American people